Marion "Pooch" Hall, Jr. (born February 8, 1976) is an American television and film actor known for his role as Derwin Davis, the football player on the sitcom The Game, and as Ricky in the 2011 film Jumping the Broom. He also played the character of Daryll Donovan in the Showtime drama Ray Donovan.

Hall portrayed Muhammad Ali in the 2016 sports biography film Chuck, about Ali's opponent Chuck Wepner and the Ali–Wepner 1975 world heavyweight title boxing bout.

Early life
Marion H. Hall, Jr. is the son of Marion and Cindy Hall. He was born in Brockton, Massachusetts and attended Brockton High School. In 1994, he won the Southern New England Golden Gloves for boxing. Hall attended the University of Massachusetts Dartmouth where he first began acting with the UMass Dartmouth Theatre Company.

Career
Hall started his career doing commercials and modeling. Hall landed his first acting role in the 2001 Lift. That same year, he appeared in Blue Hill Avenue. In 2003, he served as co-host for The N reality series Girls v. Boys. In 2005, he portrayed Ty'ree in the miniseries Miracle's Boys. The following year, he won the role of Derwin Davis on Game. He was featured as Chrisette Michele's love interest in her music video "What You Do".

Hall had a recurring role on the CBS sitcom Accidentally on Purpose during its 2009–2010 season. He replaced Cory Hardrict (the husband of Tia Mowry, his co-star from The Game). In an interview on The Tom Joyner Morning Show, Hall clarified details about his departure from the series The Game. "My contract came up, I promise you. We negotiated, and we couldn't come up with a number. So my team said we're going to send you out [to auditions]". Hall said the Showtime series Ray Donovan knew about his commitment to BET, but it took so long to respond to his agents; however, he continued to move forward with his new projects. "I never did quit the show," Hall said. "When The Game got canceled, I was offered another job and I booked Ray Donovan the next day." Hall made a guest appearance for the sixth season in one episode "The Blueprint" and in the series finale.

On September 18, 2015, he was cast in A Dog's Purpose.

Personal life
Hall met his wife Linda in 1996 when she was a freshman in college. They married in 1997. They have four children.

Filmography

Film

Television

References

External links
 

1976 births
Living people
Musicians from Brockton, Massachusetts
American male film actors
University of Massachusetts Dartmouth alumni
African-American male actors
Male actors from Massachusetts
21st-century African-American people
20th-century African-American people